Rusa III  was king of Urartu. He was called "Rusa Erimenahi" ("the son of Erimena"). He may have been the nephew or cousin of Rusa II. Little is known about his reign; his name was inscribed on a massive granary at Armavir and on a series of bronze shields from the temple of Khaldi found at Rusahinili, now held in the British Museum. There is considerable confusion over the identity of Rusa III, when he ruled, and his relationship to other kings or even the actual dates he ruled.

Rusa was the father of Sarduri IV.

See also

 List of kings of Urartu

References

Urartian kings
7th-century BC rulers